The Qagannur Formation is a Mesozoic geologic formation in China. Dinosaur remains are among the fossils that have been recovered from the formation, although none have yet been referred to a specific genus. The informal sauropod "Nurosaurus" is known from this formation.

Paleofauna
"Nurosaurus qaganensis" - "partial skeleton"
Stegosauria indet. - "plates and scapula"

See also

 List of dinosaur-bearing rock formations
 List of stratigraphic units with indeterminate dinosaur fossils

References

Mesozoic Erathem of Asia